The genus Eridacnis, the ribbontail catsharks, is a small genus of fin-back catsharks in the family Proscylliidae.  It currently consists of the following species:
 Eridacnis barbouri (Bigelow & Schroeder, 1944) (Cuban ribbontail catshark)
 Eridacnis radcliffei H. M. Smith, 1913 (pygmy ribbontail catshark)
 Eridacnis sinuans (J. L. B. Smith, 1957) (African ribbontail catshark)

References

 

 
Shark genera
Taxa named by Hugh McCormick Smith